Alex Morgan is a World Cup and European Cup winner, who participated in more than 50 international racing events in 13 countries. In Mexico, Morgan has received the award Water Craft Racer of the Mexico Century.

Early life
Morgan grew up in Redondo Beach, California and attended south high school. Alex was an avid street bike racer until he suffered an injury due to an severe  accident forcing him to quit racing bikes. During summer vacation that same year, Morgan had traveled to the Bahamas and decided to rent a Kawasaki Jet Ski. Looking to replace the thrill of street bike riding, he ultimately decided that jet skiing was for him and upon his return he purchased his own Kawasaki jet ski. Morgan then spent most of his weekends riding in his local lake and occasionally ocean riding when time permitted. One such weekend trip to Puerto Vallarta as Morgan pulled up to his favourite ride spot, there was an IJSBA-sanctioned race going on. Confident in his skill, Morgan wondered how he would do against other riders in the competition, so he signed up and joined fourteen 14 other riders. Despite lack of quality racing fuel and little to no racing experience, he finished well. And was motivated to improve and to find what kind of heights he could reach in the sport.

Career 

Morgan went on to race in the national IJSBA sanctioned tour finishing third place. He then later said "this made me feel good because I felt like I had the skill to do well" and was surprised when his picture showed up in the following days newspaper.

This garnered the attention and support of the Mexico department of tourism, Morgan also received sponsorship deals from many other companies. Soon after Morgan went on to join the Broadway cigarettes racing team and by the end of the year won championships in both classes and was crowned Mexico's national champion. Morgan was then invited to represent Mexico in Europe during a World cup open ocean race. The event was an endurance type race consisting of 60 riders from around the world. Morgan held his position as best as he could and finished in 21st place. Morgan then went on to participate in various US tours finishing 1st and 2nd place.
 
After returning home, Morgan received the Mexican Athlete of the Century Award and was recognized as one of the best jet ski pilots in the world. He also started a serious training program and felt determined to bring home more titles and cups.

Following his successes in Mexico, Morgan now represented Mexico in all international races such as the World Cup UIM, European pro tour UIM, US pro tour and US World Cup. He received the national medal for achievement in sports shortly prior to becoming the first Mexican and first in the americas to have won the European cup and be crowned champion.

Morgan then received his second national medal for achievement in sports and went on to produce the Alex Morgan Race of the stars show which aired on national television in 2003. In 2004 Morgan became the first Mexican to have won the World Cup and produced a second race of the stars, this time taking place in Puerto Vallarta, Mexico. Morgan then finished 1st and became World champion for a second time in 2006.

In 2007 Alex Had a short stint as a jet ski trainer for celebrities such as Cristiano Ronaldo, Fher Olvera, Alejandro Fernández and others.
Alejandro Fernández Made a guest appearance on Alex Morgan's show titled "the race of the stars" which consists of Alex and other celebrity guest and athletes including the 10 highest internationally rated jet ski riders compete alongside each other using  jet skis of equal class.

Motorsports

In 2012, Morgan participated in sportscar racing with the Maserati Team at the Maserati Corse Race Trials at the Mugello Circuit, Formula 1 Track in Florence, Italy.

Personal life
Morgan currently resides in Miami, Florida. He attended Universidad Autónoma de Guadalajara. He has three sons, Kevin, Lance and Henry.

Honours and achievements
 1997 Mexican national tour champion.
 1997 Represented Mexico in UIM World cup in Crete, Greece
 1998 Signed sponsorship agreements with Tequila Don Julio
 2000 Received the Mexican Athlete of the Century Award for Motonautica
 2002 Received National Medal for Achievement in Sports
 2002 UIM European Cup Champion, US Pro Tour, US World Cup
 2002 Signed sponsorship agreements with Trump Grande
 2003 Received National Medal for Achievement in Sports
 2003 Organized and Produced Alex Morgan Race of the Stars, GDL Mex
 2003 European Pro Tour UIM, US Pro Tour, US World Cup
 2004 European Pro Tour UIM, US Pro Tour, Champion US World Cup
 2004 Organized and Produced Alex Morgan Race of the Stars, PV Mex
 2006 European Pro Tour UIM, US Pro Tour, Champion US World Cup

References

Living people
Year of birth missing (living people)
People from Torrance, California
Personal water craft